Zee Zest, formerly Living Foodz, is an international, 24-hour food and lifestyle television channel based in Mumbai, Maharashtra, India. It is a part of the Living Entertainment brand of channels, which is owned by Zee Entertainment Enterprises. The channel airs shows hosted by chefs and anchors like Chef Ajay Chopra, Rakesh Raghunathan, Chef Pankaj Bhadouria, Chef Kunal Kapur.

Programming
 Chef on Wheels: Gautam Mehrishi goes on a road trip to find out where our fruits and vegetables originate and meets the people behind it.
 Food Xpress: TV anchors Rocky and Mayur go on a culinary journey around India.
 Kitchen Magic: Professional chef Gautam Mehrishi experiments with common recipes and shares techniques that can be used at home.
 I Love Cooking: Former MTV India VJ Maria Goretti gives her own personal touch to traditional recipes and dishes.
 The Great Indian Rasoi: Chef Ranveer Brar’s show features long lost recipes and hidden secrets in traditional Indian kitchens.

Previous logos

See also
 Zee Network
 Zee TV
 Zee Living

References

Zee Entertainment Enterprises
Indian cuisine
Food and drink television
Television channels and stations established in 2012